Thomas D. Bailey (October 31, 1897 – August 10, 1974) was a public official who served as Florida Superintendent of Education from 1949 until 1965.

Bailey was born October 31, 1897, in Lugoff, South Carolina.
His education started in the public schools of South Carolina, and he got his Bachelor of Arts degree  in 1919 from Wofford College in Spartanburg
He then went on to obtain a masters degree in education from the University of Florida.

He married Miss Burness McConnell and they had two children together, Mrs W. C. McNab and A.L. Shealy Jr.

Bailey is credited with a handbook on Florida public school bus transportation. He also oversaw the publication of a guide to secondary school mathematics education in Florida, a guide for art education (1965), a guide for science education in Florida's secondary schools, and Biennial Report of the State Department of Education for 1948 to 1950, A collection of his addresses from 1950 until March 1963 was published as Trails in Florida Education.

He opposed having Gay educators, and was a supporter of segregation.
He also causes controversy by planning to increase religious training within public schools even though he claimed that it was not his intention to go against "the traditional separation of church and state".

He is pictured in 1951 along with a plaque showing his motto "No man stands so straight as he who stoops to help a child.".

In 1955, he testified before a United States Senate committee on funding for school construction. He spoke about inadequate school buildings to meet the demand of Florida's growing population.

He was selected to wield a shovel at the groundbreaking ceremony for Florida Atlantic University.

He died August 10, 1974 from a heart attack while at the Waynesville, North Carolina County Club.
At the time of his death it was noted that he had served as the Florida Superintendent of Education for longer than any other person in the role.

See also
Pork Chop Gang

References

Florida Commissioners of Education
People from Lugoff, South Carolina
Wofford College alumni
University of Florida alumni
1897 births
1974 deaths